The OT M-60 is a Yugoslav armoured personnel carrier produced from 1962 to 1979.

Development
The OT (Oklopni transporter - armoured personnel carrier) M-60 was the first Yugoslav armored vehicle to enter serial production. Research and development began in 1956, and the first prototype was produced in June 1958. Prior to the commencement of serial production, the new armored personnel carrier was known as Objekat M-590. Serial production started in 1962. The M-60 first appeared in public in that year's Victory Day parade. The quality of the vehicles did not satisfy the requirements of the Yugoslav People's Army (JNA), so FAMOS began development of an upgraded model, OT M-60P (P – poboljšani – "improved") which was introduced in 1970. From 1962 to 1979, around 790 vehicles were produced, of which 190 were exported. An anti-tank variant with two 82 mm M60 recoilless guns was introduced in 1973.

Most M-60s were used in the JNA's armored and mechanized brigades, while a number were used by the Federal Police, being painted in a characteristic blue color. During the Iran–Iraq War, the M-60 was criticised for its low firepower and weak armor. During the Yugoslav Wars, the M-60 suffered serious losses, and its firepower deficiencies were once again noted. Later during the war, the M-60 was used as armoured personnel carrier (APC) for transporting ammunition to the front line and the evacuation of infantrymen and wounded combatants. The M-60 was used by almost all armies created as a result of the breakup of Yugoslavia. The Army of Serbia and Montenegro withdrew its last 121 M-60Ps from service in 2004 due to the Agreement on Sub-Regional Arms Control of 1996.

Although the M-60 was generally similar to the other APCs of the period, it never managed to meet all the criteria originally required by the JNA. Despite its disadvantages, it was widely used in the 40 years after it entered mass production and resulted in the mass mechanization of the JNA. Its deficiencies were later compensated for with the introduction of the BVP M-80 infantry fighting vehicle.

Characteristics
The basic layout is driver front left, his hatch has a day sight, which can be replaced with an infrared for night driving. To his right is co-the Bow MG operator. The commander sits behind the driver, behind bow MG operator sits operator of  12.7 mm MG on his cupola, which can be used in the anti-aircraft role.

The vehicle is powered by a 6-cylinder diesel, which generates 140 hp, giving a top road speed of 45 km/h. The vehicle is an all welded steel construction, which gives protection against small arms. It has no NBC protection system.

The rear compartment is for 10 troops who sit on benches back to back so they can fire their personal weapons through side ports (3 either side) and they depart the vehicle via two doors set in the rear.

Variants
 M-60 – First production model, also known as M-590
 M-60P – Improved model
 M-60PB – Anti-tank variant with twin 82 mm recoilless rifles mounted on the top left or top right of hull at rear.
 M-60PK – Battalion commander's vehicle
 M-60San – Medical evacuation variant with lengthened hull

Operators

Current operators

Former operators
  Iraq – 190 M-60P armoured personnel carriers ordered and delivered before 1990. Withdrawn from service.
  Yugoslavia – about 600 vehicles in various variants delivered from 1962 to 1979. Passed on to successor states.
  Republika Srpska
  Republika Srpska Krajina
  Serbia and Montenegro – last 121 operational vehicles withdrawn and scrapped in 2004.

  Croatian Army Some 60 vehicles captured in battle of the barracks used mainly as armoured ambulance - withdrawn from use in 1996.Some 6 samples in local war museums.

References
 Jane's Tanks and Combat Vehicles Recognition Guide, Christopher F. Foss, Harper Collins Publishers, 2000.

 Srpski Oklop (Serbian)

Tracked armoured personnel carriers
Armoured personnel carriers of Yugoslavia
Military Technical Institute Belgrade
Armoured personnel carriers of the Cold War
Military vehicles introduced in the 1960s